Patti Astor (born ca. 1950) is an American performer who was a key actress in New York City underground films of the 1970s, and the East Village art scene of the 1980s, and involved in the early popularizing of hip hop. She co-founded the instrumental contemporary art gallery, Fun Gallery.

Biography
Patti Astor grew up in Cincinnati, Ohio where she was a charter member of the Cincinnati Civic Ballet. Her adventurous spirit however took her to New York City at the age of eighteen (in 1968) to Barnard College but she soon dropped out to take a leadership role in the anti-Vietnam war group SDS (Students for a Democratic Society). She spent two and a half years as a young revolutionary. At the end of that war she traveled the United States and Europe with her dance act, A Diamond As Big As The Ritz.

Music
Returning to New York in 1975 Astor was in the midst of the storm in New York's legendary East Village, from punk rock at CBGB's, the new wave at the Mudd Club and independent films such as Underground U.S.A. (1980) with directors such as Jim Jarmusch and Eric Mitchell. In 1978, she married Steven Kramer, and artist and a keyboardist for a band called the Contortions.

Actress
Astor had studied acting at the Lee Strasberg Institute. A queen of the downtown scene, she appeared in over a dozen experimental and low-budget films. Her entry into this genre was Amos Poe's underground "Unmade Beds" (1976), a black and white 16mm remake of Godard's Breathless which she acted in alongside filmmaker Eric Mitchell, Blondie singer Debbie Harry, and artist Duncan Hannah. She also appeared in such low-budget and low-audience films as Rome '78, The Long Island Four, and Snakewoman. Perhaps the best remembered of these was Eric Mitchell's Underground U.S.A (1980), which she starred in alongside poet Rene Ricard, but none of these films were commercially successful. Her best known roles was as Virginia, the roving reporter, in Charles Ahearn's legendary hip-hop epic, Wild Style. Virginia in Wild Style is a blonde bombshell who encounters the rap and graffiti culture uptown, and introduces it to the downtown art world, a role Patti went on to perform in real life.

These films are in the permanent collections of the Museum of Modern Art, the Whitney Museum, and the Rock and Roll Hall of Fame. (Wild Style was voted "one of the ten best rock and roll movies of all time".)

Gallery owner
Astor went on to co-found the Fun Gallery in 1981 with partner Bill Stelling. This tenement storefront gallery, was the first of the 1980s East Village galleries, and specialized in showing graffiti artists, like Fab 5 Freddy, Lee Quiñones, Zephyr, Dondi, Lady Pink, and Futura 2000. It also gave important shows to Kenny Scharf (in 1981), Jean-Michel Basquiat (November 1982), and Keith Haring (February, 1983), artists with a street background who showed elsewhere. For a while the mix of worlds was unique, with the FUN crew of downtown artists and hipsters, beat-boys, rock, movie and rap stars mixing with both neighborhood kids and the official art world: museum directors, art historians and uptown collectors in their mink coats and limos. The gallery closed in 1985, by which time many other East Village galleries had opened, the interest in graffiti painters in the art world has subsided, and rents in the East Village were rising dramatically.

Later years
After closing Fun Gallery, Astor moved to Hollywood where she acted in, wrote and produced Get Tux'd starring Ice-T in one of his first movie roles and Assault of the Killer Bimbos awarded by People magazine "Trash Pick of The Week".

Bibliography
 “The True Story of Patti Astor” in Johnny Walker, Janette Beckman, Patti Astor, Peter Beste, No Sleep 'til Brooklyn Perseus Distribution Services. .
 Dan Cameron, Liza Kirwin, Alan Moore, Penny Arcade, Patti Astor. East Village USA New Museum of Contemporary Art, 0915557886.

Filmography

References

External links
Interview with Patti Astor
No Sleep ‘til Brooklyn: A powerHouse Hip Hop Retrospective

  promotional clip (8:40) for documentary “Patti Astor's FUN Gallery,” Robert David Films, Inc.
 Interview with Patti Astor on Fun Gallery, 149th St. website

1950 births
Living people
American film actresses
20th-century American actresses
Actresses from Cincinnati
Actresses from New York City
Lee Strasberg Theatre and Film Institute alumni
Barnard College alumni
21st-century American women